Jorge Alberto Chevalier is a retired Argentine general who held the Chief of the Joint Chiefs of Staff from 2003 to until 2013. He is the only longest serving chief of the Argentine armed forces holding the position for 10 years.

Appointment as 
He was appointed by the then President Néstor Kirchner with just 8 weeks of assuming the office of President of Argentine, Alberto Chevalier occupied the office from 20 May 2003 to 26 June 2013.

References

External links 

 

 

1933 births
Living people
Argentine Air Force brigadiers
Argentine generals